Syed Jahangir (2 January 1935 – 29 December 2018) was a Bangladeshi painter. He was awarded Ekushey Padak by the Government of Bangladesh in 1985. He served as the department head of the Arts Faculty at Shilpakala Academy in 1977. His notable paintings include Attmar Ujjibon, Ullas, Dhoni, Ojana-Oneshya and Osoni-Sangket.

Early life and education
Jahangir was born in Satkhira on 2 January 1935. He graduated in Fine Arts from Government Art Institute of Arts and Crafts (now Faculty of Fine Arts, University of Dhaka). He painted for over 55 years including 9000 oils, watercolors and mixed medias. Through his career, Jahangir has held 35 solo and 1 group exhibition. On 22 February 2007, one exhibition of Jahangir was held in Chitrak Gallery along with other painters such as Nitun Kundu, Samarjit Chowdhury, Rafiqun Nabi, Mahmudul Haque, Hamiduzzaman Khan and Hashem Khan.

Awards
2011 Hamidur Rahman Award
2010 Lifetime Achievement Award by Berger Bangladesh
2005 Shashi Bhushan honourable award
2005 Sultan Smrity Gold Medal
2000 Michael Madhusudan Academy Award
1992 Bangladesh Charushilpi Sangsad Honour, Shilpacharya Zainul Abedin Birth Anniversary, Dhaka
1988 Satkhira Press Club Award
1985 Ekushey Padak
1975 Honorable mention Award at the National Art Exhibition, Dhaka
1958 Leaders' and Specialists' Exchange grant by the US Education Foundation

References

External links

1935 births
2018 deaths
People from Satkhira District
Bengali male artists
Recipients of the Ekushey Padak
20th-century Bangladeshi painters
20th-century male artists
21st-century Bangladeshi painters